This a list of philatelic bureaus across the world.

In philately, a philatelic bureau is the part of a national postal administration that sells philatelic items to stamp collectors, tourists and stamp dealers.

Bureaus by country

 Afghanistan - Afghan Post
 Albania - Posta Shqiptare
 Algeria - Poste Algérie link Poste Algérie
 Argentina - Correo Argentino
 Australia - Australia Post
 Austria - Österreichische Post
 Bangladesh - Bangladesh Post Office
 Barbados - Barbados Postal Service
 Belarus - Belarus Post Belarus Philatelic Bureau
 Belgium - Belgian Post Group
 Belize - Belize Postal Service
 Bhutan - Bhutan Post
 Bosnia and Herzegovina - There are three separate services for Bosnia Herzegovina. - BH Pošta Sarajevo Philatelic Bureau Federation of Bosnia Herzegovina - Hrvatske pošte Mostar Croatian service. - SrpskePoste Banja Luka Philatelic Bureau Republica Srpska Post office.
 Botswana - Botswana Post
 Brazil - Empresa Brasileira de Correios e Telégrafos  in Portuguese
 Bulgaria
 Burundi Philatelic Bureau
 Canada - Canada Post
 Cape Verde - Correios de Cabo Verde in Portuguese
 Chile - Correos de Chile
 China - State Post Bureau site
 Colombia - Correos de Colombia
 Croatia - Hrvatska pošta (Croatian Post)
 Cuba - Correos de Cuba in Spanish, registration is needed
 Cyprus  - Cyprus Postal Services
 Denmark - Danmark Post
 Egypt - Egypt Post
 Equatorial Guinea
 Estonia - Eesti Post
 Eritrea
 Ethiopia
 Fiji - Post Fiji
 Finland - Itella
 France - La Poste
 Germany - Deutsche Post
 Gibraltar - Gibraltar Philatelic Bureau
 Guernsey - Guernsey Post
 Guinea
 Guinea Bissau Post Office site
 Faroe Islands - Postverk Føroya
 Hong Kong - Hongkong Post
 India - India Post
 Indonesia - Pos Indonesia
 Iran - Iran Post
 Iraq - Iraqi Telecommunications and Post Company
 Ireland - An Post
 Isle of Man - Isle of Man Post Office
 Italy - Poste Italiane
 Japan - Japan Post
 Jersey - Jersey Post
 Kyrgyzstan - There are two officially designated postal operators: Kyrgyz Pochtasy and Kyrgyz Express Post
 Macau - Correios de Macau
 Malaysia - Pos Malaysia
 Malta - Malta Post
 Monaco - La Poste de Monaco
 Montenegro
 Montserrat - Montserrat Stamp Bureau
 Nepal - Nepal Post
 Netherlands - PostNL
 New Zealand - New Zealand Post - Auckland City Stamps
 North Macedonia - North Macedonia Post
 Norway - Posten Norge
 Pakistan - Pakistan Post
 Palau
 Palestinian National Authority - Palestine Post
 Philippines - Philippine Postal Corporation
 Poland - Polish Post
 Russia - Russian Post Official philatelic seller
 San Marino - Poste sammarinesi
 Saudi Arabia - Saudi Post
 Senegal
 Serbia Philatelic site
 Singapore - Singapore Post
 Slovenia
 Slovakia
 Solomon Islands - Solopost
 Somalia - Somali Postal Service
 Sri Lanka - Sri Lanka Post
 Swaziland
 Switzerland
 Thailand - Thailand Post
 Tunisia
 Turkey
 Tuvalu - Tuvalu Philatelic Bureau
 Ukraine - Ukrposhta
 United Kingdom - Royal Mail (Crown Dependencies and British Overseas Territories are separate)
 United States of America - United States Postal Service
 Vanuatu
 Vatican City State - Poste Vaticane
 Vietnam
 Uruguay Philatelic shop
 Zambia
 Zimbabwe - ZimPost

External links
 Australia Post
 Austrian Post
 Barbados Postal Service
 Canada Post
 Cyprus Postal Services
 Fiji Post
 Deutsche Post
 Gibraltar Philatelic Bureau
 Greenland Philatelic Bureau
 Hongkong Post
 Iceland Post
 Israel Postal Company
 India Post Philatelic Bureau
 Irish Post Office
 Isle of Man Post Office
 Post Italia Philately
 Japan Post
 Kyrgyz Express Post
 Kyrgyz Pochtasy
 Latvian Post
 Lithuania Post
 Pos Malaysia
 North Macedonia Post Philately
  Malta Post
 Monaco
 Netherlands PostNL
 Norway Post
 New Zealand Post
 Pakistan Post Official Website
 Pakistan Post - Stamps
 Poland Post
 Portugal, Madeira, Azores
 Qatar stamps
 Russia stamps catalogue
 Singapore Post
 Thailand Post
 Turkey philatelic issues
 Tuvalu Tourism Philatelic Bureau
 United States Postal Service
 Vanuatu Post
 Worldwide listing of philatelic bureau details